The Billboard Top Latin Albums chart, published by Billboard magazine, is a record chart that ranks the performance of Latin music albums in the United States. The data is compiled by Nielsen SoundScan from a sample that includes music stores, music departments at electronics and department stores, Internet sales (both physical and digital) and verifiable sales from concert venues in the United States. The multi-metric methodology to compile the Top Latin Albums chart also includes track equivalent album units and streaming equivalent album units.

The first number-one album of the decade was X 100pre by Puerto Rican rapper Bad Bunny.

Number one albums

References
General

Specific

United States Latin Albums
2010 Latin
2020s in Latin music